Lago di Montepulciano is a lake in the Province of Siena, Tuscany, Italy. At an elevation of 249 m, its surface area is 1.9 km².

Lakes of Tuscany